The United Kingdom of Great Britain and Northern Ireland competed as Great Britain at the 1968 Winter Olympics in Grenoble, France. Great Britain did not win any medals at these games, the highest finish was fourth in Alpine Skiing.

Alpine skiing

Men

Men's slalom

Women

Biathlon

Men

 1 One minute added per close miss (a hit in the outer ring), two minutes added per complete miss.

Men's 4 x 7.5 km relay

 2 A penalty loop of 200 metres had to be skied per missed target.

Bobsleigh

Cross-country skiing

Men

Figure skating

Men

Women

Pairs

Luge

Men

Speed skating

Men

Women

References
Official Olympic Reports
International Olympic Committee results database
 Olympic Winter Games 1968, full results by sports-reference.com

Nations at the 1968 Winter Olympics
1968
Winter Olympics
Winter sports in the United Kingdom